Equestrian at the 2015 Southeast Asian Games was held in Singapore Turf Club Riding Centre, Singapore from 6 to 10 June 2015. Medals were awarded in second disciplines for both individual and team competitions.

Participating nations
A total of 38 athletes from eight nations competed in equestrian at the 2015 Southeast Asian Games:

Competition schedule
The following is the competition schedule for the equestrian competitions:

Medalists

Medal table

References

External links
 

2015
Southeast Asian Games
2015 Southeast Asian Games events
Equestrian sports competitions in Singapore